Mikhail Ledovskikh (born August 8, 1986) is a professional tennis player. He began playing tennis when he was seven. Currently residing in  Sochi, Russia, he is coached by Alec Baranov.

ATP Challenger and ITF Futures finals

Singles: 5 (1–4)

References

External links
 
 
 Mikhail Ledovskikh at ESPN

Sportspeople from Almaty
Russian male tennis players
Russian people of Kazakhstani descent
1986 births
Living people